Scottsburgh may refer to:

In South Africa

Scottburgh, KwaZulu-Natal

In the United States

Scottsburgh, California
Scottsburgh, former name of Centerville, Fresno County, California
Scottsburgh, former name of Scottsburg, Indiana
Scottsburgh, former name of the hamlet Scottsburg, now part of Sparta, New York